The Jealous Girlfriends is eponymous second album from the American rock band The Jealous Girlfriends.

Track listing

References

2007 albums
The Jealous Girlfriends albums
Last Gang Records albums